Excised and anatomised is an EP by Swedish death metal band Evocation. The EP contains covers of songs by Bolt Thrower, Carcass, Napalm Death, Edge of Sanity and At The Gates. It was released on 3 September 2013 in North America through iTunes and CMDistro on vinyl.

Track listing

Personnel
Evocation
 Janne K. Bodén - drums
 Vesa Kenttäkumpu - guitars
 Marko Palmén - guitars
 Thomas Josefsson - vocals 
 Gustaf Jorde - bass

Miscellaneous staff
 Dan Swanö - mixing, mastering, producer
 Michał "Xaay" Loranc - cover art, layout

References

2013 EPs
Albums produced by Dan Swanö